Cacia parelegans is a species of beetle in the family Cerambycidae. It was described by Stephan von Breuning in 1982. It is known from Borneo.

References

Cacia (beetle)
Beetles described in 1982